Robin James Hunter-Clarke (born 10 October 1992) is a British politician, solicitor, former parliamentary candidate and county councillor, and former Chief of Staff to Neil Hamilton and UKIP in the Senedd. He has been a candidate in both the 2015 and the 2017 general election. He served as the national UKIP co-ordinator for Vote Leave, the official leave campaign during the European Union referendum.

Political career 
Hunter-Clarke began his political career at the age of eighteen, when he was elected as a town councillor in the May 2011 local elections. He was elected to Skegness Town Council, standing for the Conservative Party. He defected to the UK Independence Party (UKIP) in September 2012 at the party's national conference in Birmingham, making him the only UKIP member of Skegness town council. In the May 2013 local elections, he was the UKIP candidate for the Skegness South Seat division of Lincolnshire County Council. He took the seat, beating the incumbent Conservative councillor, while his father Dean Hunter-Clarke won the Skegness North Seat for UKIP. Hunter-Clarke won the seat while a Law student at the University of Chester, which led to some publicity at the time.

Hunter-Clarke was elected onto UKIP's National Executive Committee in 2014. On 20 November 2014, Hunter-Clarke, then 22, was announced as UKIP's parliamentary candidate in the seat of Boston & Skegness. Being considered winnable, this was a key seat for the party, but Hunter-Clarke was ultimately defeated by the Telegraph journalist Matt Warman.

After the general election, Hunter-Clarke became the national UKIP co-ordinator for the fledgling referendum campaign Vote Leave. This prompted UKIP to release a statement as the party was currently backing neither Vote Leave nor Grassroots Out for the Electoral Commission designation.

Hunter-Clarke was Neil Hamilton's agent for the National Assembly for Wales election in May 2016. On Hamilton's election,  he made Hunter-Clarke his personal chief of staff. After Hamilton was elected as the group leader, Hunter-Clarke became chief of staff for the group.

Hunter-Clarke announced his intention to stand in the Sleaford & North Hykeham by-election, a neighbouring seat to Boston & Skegness, but later withdrew from the contest.

In June 2018 Hunter-Clarke was dismissed as the group's Chief of Staff in the National Assembly for Wales after Caroline Jones ousted Hamilton as the Leader of the UKIP Group. Hunter-Clarke consequently took Jones and the UKIP Assembly Members to an employment tribunal. At a preliminary hearing on 28 February 2019 the Assembly Commission, Michelle Brown AM and Caroline Jones AM failed in their applications to be removed as respondents in the case. The case continued, and a three-day preliminary hearing was listed to be heard in June 2019.

On 3, 4, and 5 June 2019 a three-day hearing took place in Pontypridd to determine who in fact employed Hunter-Clarke, as still no-one admitted to being his boss. On 4 June it was suggested that Hunter-Clarke had indeed not been dismissed and therefore was entitled to a year's back pay. Following the evidence heard Hunter-Clarke withdrew his claims against the National Assembly for Wales, Caroline Jones AM and the UKIP Group. This left Neil Hamilton AM as the sole respondent in the case. Hunter-Clarke's representative subsequently outlined that it was now clear 'Mr Hamilton was trying to make a political point at Mr Hunter-Clarke's expense'.

On 19 June 2019, Judge Moore ruled that Neil Hamilton AM was Hunter-Clarke's employer for the purposes of S230 of the Employment Rights Act 1996.

References

1992 births
21st-century British politicians
Alumni of the University of Chester
Conservative Party (UK) councillors
Living people
Members of Lincolnshire County Council
People from Boston, Lincolnshire
UK Independence Party politicians